Beyt-e Seyvan (also Romanized as Beyt-e Seyvān; also known as Shāveh Seyvān, Shāveh-ye Seyvān, and Shāveh-ye Şeyvān) is a village in Moshrageh Rural District, Moshrageh District, Ramshir County, Khuzestan Province, Iran. At the 2006 census, its population was 306, in 57 families.

References 

Populated places in Ramshir County